The abbey of Saint Mary of Arles-sur-Tech (Notre-Dame d'Arles-sur-Tech) was a Benedictine monastery in Arles-sur-Tech in the Vallespir between the ninth century and the eighteenth. It was dedicated to Mary, mother of Jesus, and belonged to the diocese of Perpignan.

The abbey was in existence by the early ninth century. As the "monastery of Vallespir", it is listed in the Notice of the Service of the Monasteries, compiled in 819 for Emperor Louis the Pious. It is placed in the province of Septimania and is recorded as owing prayers for the imperial family, but not military service or taxes.

The independent existence of the monastery came to an end in 1592. At that time the abbey of Sorède had no monks and Arles had only eight. At the start of the French Revolution in 1789, the united monastery had only six monks. The building was spared destruction and expropriation, but the abbey was dissolved and the building became the parish church.

Notes

Bibliography

Christian monasteries established in the 9th century
Benedictine monasteries in France
Buildings and structures in Pyrénées-Orientales